Victor Upton-Brown (1 November 1880 – 23 May 1964) was an Australian rules football coach who coached University for a season while they were in the Victorian Football League (VFL).

Upton-Brown coached University when Gerald Brosnan stepped aside for the 1913 season but couldn't steer the club to a single win from his 18 games in charge. When not coaching, Upton-Brown spent some time as a boundary and field umpire in the VFL.

He was involved in the early Australian movie industry, writing and directing How McDougall Topped the Score based on the play How McDougall Topped the Score which was released in 1924. He is also credited as having acted in the 1920 film: The Kelly Gang, which starred Godfrey Cass.

He also taught at Wesley College in Melbourne and is credited as the lyricist of several school songs, including "Grey Towers". He was also the editor of the 1910 version of that school's songbook.

He opened the South Yarra Cinema in the suburb of South Yarra, on 22 November 1915, where he lectured on movies.

He was an occasional contributor to The Argus newspaper in Melbourne during 1914 and 1915.

References

All The Stats: Victor Upton-Brown

Australian Football League umpires
University Football Club coaches
Australian male film actors
Australian film directors
Australian screenwriters
People educated at Wesley College (Victoria)
1880 births
1964 deaths
20th-century Australian screenwriters